Lightcliffe Academy (formerly Hipperholme and Lightcliffe High School and Eastfield) is a high school situated between Lightcliffe and Hipperholme in West Yorkshire, England. The school has academy status.

Ofsted 
Lightcliffe Academy is currently rated as Requires Improvement.

References

External links
School website

Academies in Calderdale
Secondary schools in Calderdale